Ankavandra Airport  is an airport in Ankavandra, a town in the Menabe Region  in Madagascar. It is located west of Antananarivo, the capital of Madagascar.

Airlines and destinations

References

Airports in Madagascar
Menabe